The Juno Award for Contemporary Jazz Album of the Year was presented as recognition each year for the best contemporary jazz album in Canada. It was first presented in 1994, after the Juno Awards split the former award for Best Jazz Album into separate categories for contemporary and traditional jazz, and was discontinued after 2014, when the traditional and contemporary jazz categories were replaced with new categories for Jazz Album - Solo and Jazz Album - Group.

Winners

Best Contemporary Jazz Album (1994 – 1999)

Best Contemporary Jazz Album – Instrumental (2000 – 2002)

Contemporary Jazz Album of the Year (2003 – 2014)

References

Contemporary Album Of The Year
Jazz awards
Album awards